Acusilas lepidus is a spider species in the genus Acusilas. It is found in Myanmar.

See also
 List of Araneidae species: A

References

Araneidae
Endemic fauna of Myanmar
Spiders of Asia
Spiders described in 1898